Nicolae G. Rădulescu-Niger (born Nicolae Gheorghiu; January 2, 1861 – June 3, 1944) was a Romanian prose writer, playwright and poet.

Born in Bârlad, his father Radu Gheorghiu was a merchant. He attended high school in Brăila (under the name Nicolae Rădulescu, from his father's first name) and in Bârlad (as Nicolae Gheorghiu Rădulescu). He worked as a clerk at the Religious Affairs and Arts Ministry. Starting in 1883, Rădulescu was an editor for various publications: Opinia, Revista nouă, Revista literară, Revista copiilor; he also headed Apărătorul săteanului magazine. His verses appeared in Literatorul.

Rădulescu's first book was the 1879 novel Fiii ucigașului. This was followed by additional novels (Străin în țara lui, 1900; Tribunul poporului, 1903; Măria-sa ogorul, 1907; Viață de artistă, 1925; Omul de cristal, 1930), short story collections (Căpitanul Ropotă, 1893; Deziluzii, 1921; Vulturul îndrăgostit, 1926), theater plays (De pe urma beției, 1906; Poștașul dragostei, 1913; Unirea Mare, 1919) and books of poetry (Rustice, 1893; Glasul apelor, 1915). In 1901, he was awarded the Romanian Academy's prize for the fourth volume of the Rustice cycle. He died in Bucharest.

Notes

1861 births
1944 deaths
People from Bârlad
Romanian poets
Romanian novelists
Romanian short story writers
Romanian male short story writers
Romanian dramatists and playwrights
Romanian magazine editors
Romanian civil servants